The R809 road is a regional road in three sections in Dublin and Fingal, Ireland. It connects the R807 in Bettyglen to the R105 in Sutton following a roughly semicircular path that runs north, then east, then south, connecting one point on the coast road of Dublin Bay with another point, further northeast.

The official definition of the R809 from the Roads Act, 1993 (Classification of Regional Roads) Order, 2012  states:

R809: Raheny - Baldoyle, County Dublin

Between its junction with R807 at James Larkin Road and its junction with R104 at Tonlegee Road via Watermill Road, Main Street Raheny, Station Road Raheny and Raheny Road all in the city of Dublin

and

between its junction with R104 at Kilbarrack Road and its junction with R139 at Grange Road via Grange Road all in the city of Dublin

and

between its junction with R106 at Strand Street Baldoyle and its junction with R105 at Dublin Road Sutton via Warrenhouse Road and Baldoyle Road all in the county of Fingal.

and

between its junction with R106 at Strand Street Baldoyle and its junction with R105 at Dublin Road Sutton via Warrenhouse Road and Baldoyle Road all in the county of Fingal.

See also
Roads in Ireland
Regional road

References

Regional roads in the Republic of Ireland
Roads in County Dublin